Katni officially Murwara is a city on the banks of the Katni River in Madhya Pradesh, India. It is the administrative headquarters of Katni District. It is in the Mahakoshal region of central India.

Demographics

As of the 2011 Census of India, Murwara (Katni) municipality had a population of 221,875.  Effective literacy was 87.43%; male literacy was 92.77% and female literacy was 81.64%.

See also 
 Bahuriband
 Bandhavgarh National Park
 List of educational institutions in Katni

References

External links 
 Katni government website

 
Tehsil in Katni
Cities and towns in Katni district
Cities in Madhya Pradesh